Langwith may refer to:
Langwith, Derbyshire, several small settlements near to larger Shirebrook
Langwith College, a college of the University of York
Langwith Junction, Derbyshire
Langwith railway station, Derbyshire
Langwith-Whaley Thorns railway station, Derbyshire
Nether Langwith, Nottinghamshire